The canton of Velay volcanique is an administrative division of the Haute-Loire department, south-central France. It was created at the French canton reorganisation which came into effect in March 2015. Its seat is in Cussac-sur-Loire.

It consists of the following communes:
 
Alleyras
Arlempdes
Bains
Barges
Le Bouchet-Saint-Nicolas
Le Brignon
Cayres
Costaros
Cussac-sur-Loire
Lafarre
Landos
Ouides
Pradelles
Rauret
Saint-Arcons-de-Barges
Saint-Christophe-sur-Dolaison
Saint-Étienne-du-Vigan
Saint-Haon
Saint-Jean-Lachalm
Saint-Paul-de-Tartas
Séneujols
Solignac-sur-Loire
Vielprat

References

Cantons of Haute-Loire